The Cooper Village Archeological Site, designated 39SL15, encompasses what is believed to be a prehistoric Native American village in Sully County, South Dakota.  It is located on a peninsula projecting into Lake Oahe, and portions of it were identified in 1979 and 1982 as being subjected to shoreline erosion by the lake.  It is described as a small village, with four depressions identified as being consistent with dwellings, and a low mound, with occupancy believed to c. 1550-1675 CE, based on artifacts found at the site.

The site was listed on the National Register of Historic Places in 2003.

See also
National Register of Historic Places listings in Sully County, South Dakota

References

Archaeological sites on the National Register of Historic Places in South Dakota
Sully County, South Dakota
National Register of Historic Places in Sully County, South Dakota